The 2015 Elite 10 was held from March 19 to 22 at the Suncor Community Leisure Centre at MacDonald Island Park in Fort McMurray, Alberta. It was the fourth men's Grand Slam event held in the 2014–15 curling season. The Mike McEwen rink from Winnipeg won their fifth career Grand Slam title, defeating the Niklas Edin rink from Sweden in the final.

Competition format
The Elite 10 event features what is called a "match-play" format, in which the winning team of a particular game is the team that has won the most ends in that game. In match play, an end is won by stealing or scoring two with the hammer, similar to skins curling. Unlike skins, however, there are no carry-overs. Tied games will have a draw to the button competition to determine the winner. In the standings, wins are worth three points, draw to the button wins are worth two points, and draw to the button losses are worth one point.

Teams
The teams are listed as follows:

Round-robin standings
Final round-robin standings

Round-robin results
All draw times are listed in Mountain Standard Time (UTC−7).

Draw 1
Thursday, March 19, 1:30 pm

Draw 2
Thursday, March 19, 5:00 pm

Draw 3
Thursday, March 19, 8:30 pm

Draw 4
Friday, March 20, 10:00 am

Draw 5
Friday, March 20, 1:30 pm

Draw 6
Friday, March 20, 5:00 pm

Draw 7
Friday, March 20, 8:30 pm

Tiebreaker
Saturday, March 21, 9:30 am

Playoffs

Quarterfinals
Saturday, March 21, 1:00 pm

Semifinals
Saturday, March 21, 8:00 pm

Final
Sunday, March 22, 11:00 am

References

External links

2015 in Canadian curling
Curling in Alberta
Fort McMurray
2015 in Alberta